Ajam is an Arabic word meaning mute. It generally refers to someone whose mother tongue is not Arabic, as well as non-Arabs. During the Arab conquest of Persia, the term became a racial pejorative. In many languages, including Persian, Turkish, Urdu–Hindi, Azerbaijani, Bengali, Kurdish, Gujarati, Malay, Punjabi, and Swahili, Ajam and Ajami refer to Iran and Iranians respectively.

Etymology
According to traditional etymology, the word Ajam comes from the Semitic root ʿ-j-m. Related forms of the same root include, but are not limited to:
 mustaʿjim: mute, incapable of speech
 ʿajama /  ʾaʿjama / ʿajjama: to dot – in particular, to add the dots that distinguish between various Arabic letters to a text (and hence make it easier for a non-native Arabic speaker to read). It is now an obsolete term, since all modern Arabic texts are dotted. This may also be linked to ʿajām / ʿajam "pit, seed (e.g. of a date or grape)".

 inʿajama: (of speech) to be incomprehensible
 istaʿjama: to fall silent; to be unable to speak
 'aʿjam: non-fluent

Homophonous words, which may or may not be derived from the same root, include:
 ʿajama: to test (a person); to try (a food).

Modern use of "ajam" has the meaning of "non-Arab".
Its development from meaning "mute" to meaning "non-Arabic-speaking" is somewhat analogous to that of the word barbarian (< Greek  ).

Original meaning

The verb ʿajama originally meant "to mumble, and speak indistinctly", which is the opposite of ʿaraba, “to speak clearly”. Accordingly, the noun ʿujma, of the same root, is the opposite of fuṣḥa, which means "chaste, correct, Arabic language". In general, during the Umayyad period ajam was a pejorative term used by Arabs who believed in their social and political superiority, in early history after Islam. However, the distinction between Arab and Ajam is discernible in pre-Islamic poetry. The Turks also were using bilad (Belaad) e Ajam as an equivalent or synonym to Persian and Iranian, and in the Quran the word ajam was used to refer to Persians. Ajam was first used for people of Persia in the poems of pre-Islamic Arab poets; but after the advent of Islam it also referred to Turks, Zoroastrians, and others. Today, in Arabic literature, Ajam is used to refer to all non-Arabs. As the book Documents on the Persian Gulf's name explained, during the Iranian Intermezzo native Persian Muslim dynasties used both the words Ajam and Persian to refer to themselves. According to The Political Language of Islam, during the Islamic Golden Age, 'Ajam' was used colloquially as a reference to denote those whom Arabs in the Arabian Peninsula viewed as "alien" or outsiders. The early application of the term included all of the non-Arab peoples with whom the Arabs had contact including Persians, Byzantine Greeks, Ethiopians, Armenians, Assyrians, Mandaeans, Arameans, Jews, Georgians, Sabians, Samaritans, Egyptians, and Berbers.

During the early age of the Caliphates, Ajam was often synonymous with "foreigner" or "stranger".  In Western Asia, it was generally applied to the Persians, while in al-Andalus it referred to speakers of Romance languages – becoming "Aljamiado" in Spanish in reference to Arabic-script writing of those languages – and in West Africa refers to the Ajami script or the writing of local languages such as Hausa and Fulani in the Arabic alphabet.  In Zanzibar ajami and ajamo means a Persian person which comes from the Persian Gulf and the cities of Shiraz and Siraf. In Turkish, there are many documents and letters that used Ajam to refer to Persian. 
In the Persian Gulf region, people still refer to Persians as Ajami, referring to Persian carpets as sajjad al Ajami (Ajami carpet), Persian cats as Ajami cats, and Persian kings as Ajami kings.

Pejorative use
During the Umayyad period, the term developed a derogatory meaning as the word was used to refer to non-Arab speakers (primarily Persians) as illiterate and uneducated. Arab conquerors in that period tried to impose Arabic as the primary language of the subject peoples throughout their empire. Angry with the prevalence of the Persian language in the Divan and Persian society, Persian resistance to this mentality was popularised in the final verse of Ferdowsi's Shahnameh; this verse is widely regarded by Iranians as the primary reason that they speak Persian and not Arabic to this day. Under the Umayyad dynasty, official association with the Arab dominion was only given to those with the ethnic identity of the Arab and required formal association with an Arab tribe and the adoption of the client status (mawālī, another derogatory term translated to mean "slave" or "lesser" in this context). The pejorative use to denote Persians as "Ajam" is so ingrained in the Arab world that it is colloquially used to refer to Persians as "Ajam" neglecting the original definition and etymology of the word.

Colloquial use
According to Clifford Edmund Bosworth, "by the 3rd/9th century, the non-Arabs, and above all the Persians, were asserting their social and cultural equality (taswīa) with the Arabs, if not their superiority (tafżīl) over them (a process seen in the literary movement of the Šoʿūbīya). In any case, there was always in some minds a current of admiration for the ʿAǰam as heirs of an ancient, cultured tradition of life. After these controversies had died down, and the Persians had achieved a position of power in the Islamic world comparable to their numbers and capabilities, "ʿAjam" became a simple ethnic and geographical designation." Thus by the ninth century, the term was being used by Persians themselves as an ethnic term, and examples can be given by Asadi Tusi in his poem comparing the superiority of Persians and Arabs.
Accordingly: "territorial notions of “Iran,” are reflected in such terms as irānšahr, irānzamin, or Faris, the Arabicized form of Pārs/Fārs (Persia). The ethnic notion of “Iranian” is denoted by the Persian words Pārsi or Irāni, and the Arabic term Ahl Faris (inhabitants of Persia) or ʿAjam, referring to non-Arabs, but primarily to Persians as in molk-e ʿAjam (Persian kingdom) or moluk-e ʿAjam (Persian kings)."

According to The Political Language of Islam, during the Islamic Golden Age, 'Ajam' was used colloquially as a reference to denote those whom Arabs in the Arabian Peninsula viewed as "alien" or outsiders. The early application of the term included all of the non-Arab peoples with whom the Arabs had contact including Persians, Byzantine Greeks, Ethiopians, Armenians, Assyrians, Mandaeans, Arameans, Jews, Georgians, Sabians, Samaritans, Copts, and Berbers.

During the early age of the Caliphates, Ajam was often synonymous with "foreigner" or "stranger".  In Western Asia, it was generally applied to the Persians, while in al-Andalus it referred to speakers of Romance languages – becoming "Aljamiado" in Spanish in reference to Arabic-script writing of those languages – and in West Africa refers to the Ajami script or the writing of local languages such as Hausa and Fulani in the Arabic alphabet.  In Zanzibar ajami and ajamo means Persian which came from the Persian Gulf and the cities of Shiraz and Siraf. In Turkish, there are many documents and letters that used Ajam to refer to the Persians.  pages 22–44

In the Persian Gulf region today, people still refer to Persians as Ajami, referring to Persian carpets as sajjad al Ajami (Ajami carpet), Persian cat as Ajami cats, and Persian kings as Ajami kings.

Notable examples
The Persian community in Bahrain is called Ajami.
'Ajam was used by the Ottomans to refer to the Safavid dynasty.
The Abbasid Iraq Al-Ajam province (centered around Arax and Shirvan).
The Kurdish historian, Sharaf Khan Bidlisi, uses the term Ajam in his book Sharafnama (1597 CE) to refer to the Shia Persians. 
In the Eastern Anatolia Region, Azerbaijanis are sometimes referred to as acem (which is the Turkish translation of Ajam).
Mahmood Reza Ghods claimed modern Sunni Kurds of Iran use this term to denote Persians, Azeris and Southern Kurds. According to Sharhzad Mojab,  Ecem (derived from the Arabic ‘ajam) is used by Kurds to refer to Persians and, sometimes, Turks.
Adjam, Hajjam, Ajaim, Ajami, Akham (as Axam in Spain for ajam), Ayam in Europe.
In Turkish, the word acem refers to Iran and Iranian people.
It is also used as a surname.

See also
Ajami (disambiguation)
Barbarian – which came to refer to people who spoke neither Greek nor other "civilized" languages (such as Latin), and derived from a root meaning "speaking incomprehensibly" or "babbling"
Nemets – the name given to Germany or the German people in many Slavic languages, with a similar derivation to Ajam
Ajam of Kuwait
Ajam of Bahrain
Ajam of Iraq

References

External links
Unearthing a Long Ignored African Writing System, One Researcher Finds African History, by Africans

Arabic words and phrases
Pejorative terms for in-group non-members
Persian communities outside Iran
Ethno-cultural designations
Exonyms
Religion and race
Anti-Iranian sentiments
Racism in the Arab world
People of the medieval Islamic world by ethnicity